The Tourist and Heritage Railways Act 2010 (the THR Act) is a law enacted by the Parliament of the State of Victoria, Australia and is the prime statute regulating the activities of tourist and heritage rail operators in the State.  The Act covers the bulk of Victoria's operational tourist and heritage railways including many heavy and light rail operations and tramways, predominantly in regional areas of Victoria.

The Tourist and Heritage Railways Act and the supporting regulations were developed by the Transport Legislation Review conducted by the Department of Transport.  The Act was the first dedicated statute in Victoria for the tourist and heritage railways sector (the THR sector) and is also the only dedicated principal statute for the THR sector in Australia.  The Act was passed in late 2010 and came into force on 1 October 2011.  It replaced provisions regulating the THR sector in the Transport (Compliance and Miscellaneous) Act 1983.

The Tourist and Heritage Railways Act is part of the transport policy and legislation framework in Victoria headed by the Transport Integration Act.

Outline 

The broad purpose of the Act is ". . . to promote the long term viability of the tourist and heritage railway sector and promote an improvement in the operations of that sector as part of an integrated and sustainable transport system . . ."

The Act establishes a regulatory scheme with the following key elements:
 development of an asset register for tourist and heritage assets including state-owned assets
 provision for new lease agreements for the state rail assets used by tourist and heritage operators
 creation of a voluntary registration scheme
 establishment of a Tourist and Heritage Railways Registrar and advisory committee.

Industry background 
The Tourist and Heritage Railways Act and the background to its development and passage was summarised by Ian Shepherd, Kate Williams and Jenny Gabriele in an article in the Railway Gazette International.  The authors noted that "With around 60 tourist and heritage railways or tramways, Australia has more lines per capita that Europe or the USA.  A third of them are in Victoria, where Australia's railway preservation movement started with the formation of the Puffing Billy Preservation Society in 1955."  The tourist and heritage railways sector in Victoria today consists of organisations which operate, restore and preserve tourist and heritage railways and tramways.  It is estimated that around 3,500 Victorians are actively involved in the industry.  As of 1 January 2011 there were around 22 organisations across the State although only 17 are expected to be subject to the new statute.  The THR organisations operate in various locations across Victoria, primarily in regional areas.  The railways attract tourism and provide economic benefits to the regional areas where they operate with an estimated half a million people visiting the railways each year.

Parts 

The Act is divided into seven parts: 
 Preliminary
 Administration
 Tourist and Heritage Rail Asset Register
 Lease Agreements
 Voluntary Accreditation Scheme
 General
 Consequential Amendments and Savings

Coverage 

The Act regulates the majority of the operational tourist and heritage railways in Victoria.  To be covered by the Act, a tourist and heritage railway operator must be a not for profit organisation that provides historical and heritage-related rail services mostly for tourists and mostly in Victoria. The following railways are covered by the Act:

Alexandra Timber and Tramway Museum
 Ballarat Tramway Museum
 Bellarine Railway
 Bendigo Tramways
 Daylesford Spa Country Railway
 Diesel Electric Railmotor Preservation Association of Victoria
 Melbourne Tramcar Preservation Society
 Mornington Railway Preservation Society
Portland Cable Tram
 R707 Operations
 Red Cliffs Steam Railway
 Seymour Railway Heritage Centre
 South Gippsland Railway
 Steamrail Victoria
 Victorian Goldfields Railway
 Walhalla Goldfields Railway
 Yarra Valley Railway.

The Act does not apply to Victoria's most popular tourist and heritage railway, Puffing Billy. Instead, the Puffing Billy Railway is regulated by its own statute, the Emerald Tourist Railway Act 1977. The Tourist and Heritage Railways Act does also not extend to static rail exhibits such as the Williamstown Rail Museum.

Regulators 

The prime regulator of the tourist and heritage railway sector in Victoria is the Director, Transport Safety or Transport Safety Victoria (TSV). The prime regulators of the tourist and heritage railway sector in Victoria are VicTrack and the Public Transport Development Authority (trading as Public Transport Victoria).

VicTrack holds all State owned rail land, infrastructure and assets. VicTrack leases assets to tourist and heritage railway operators when they are not required for mainstream transport operations and therefore non operational. Public Transport Victoria provides general coordination and support to the THR sector and is a regulator under the Act.

VicTrack 

VicTrack is established under the Transport Integration Act and is required under that Act to ". . . provide or enable access to the non-operational transport-related land, infrastructure or assets where this supports the transport system . . . ".  VicTrack is charged with considering providing this access for a variety of reasons including for ". . . tourist and heritage rail operations . . ." and ". . . through the granting of leases for business or community purposes . . . ".  As part of this function, VicTrack is required to collaborate with the Secretary of the Department of Transport, or more particularly Public Transport Victoria, in protecting land, infrastructure and assets which are registered on the Victorian Heritage Register.  VicTrack must do this ". . . whilst ensuring that reasonable access is provided for public enjoyment and historical appreciation and that support is provided to tourist and heritage operators . . . ".

The Registrar 
Part 2 of the Act provides that the Director must appoint a person to be the Tourist and Heritage Railway Registrar.  The Registrar is the key administrator for the purposes of the Act.   The function of the Registrar is to compile and maintain an asset register for the sector, a register of lease agreements granted by VicTrack and a group register for THR railway groups.

Advisory committee 

The Act enables Public Transport Victoria to establish an advisory committee to provide advice to PTV on—
 the voluntary registration scheme for T and H operators; and
 other matters relating to the provision of historical and heritage related rail services.

The number of members and the composition of the advisory committee is set out in regulations made under the Act.

Rail asset register 
Part 3 of the Tourist and Heritage Railways Act provides for establishment and operation of a tourist and heritage rail asset register.  The broad purpose of the Part is to gather and maintain accurate information about THR assets.  The register is required to be established by Public Transport Victoria and divided into three divisions listing assets owned by the State, assets owned by custodians and assets owned by persons other than the State or the custodian which the owner has elected to include on the register.  The remainder of the provisions regulate the information to be included in the register, the form of the register and access, currency and accuracy of information, inspection of assets and the relationship of the register to the separate Victorian Heritage Register established under the Heritage Act 1995.

Lease agreements 
Part 4 of the Act sets out a scheme to facilitate the leasing of land and assets by VicTrack for tourist and heritage railways purposes.  The Act provides power for VicTrack to grant leases of land which must include  a range of matters including a description of the land and fixtures, the term of the lease, the amount of rent (if payable), maintenance and insurance arrangements, subleasing rights or restrictions, reclamation rights and other matters.  Similar provision is made for the leasing of assets and these also require the lease to include certain minimum terms.  The Part also imposes a duty on VicTrack to provide copies of leases to the Registrar who must keep a register of the agreements and details about duration and renewal.

Voluntary accreditation scheme 

Part 5 of the Act provides for a voluntary accreditation scheme for tourist and heritage railway operators.  Public Transport Victoria is required to establish the scheme and a register known as the Tourist and Heritage Railway Group Register.  The purpose of the scheme is to enable operators which meet certain criteria to register in order to demonstrate their commitment to best business practice and continuous improvement and to access programs and initiatives made available under the scheme.

The other provisions in the Part regulate the matters to be recorded in the register, applications for registration, registration itself, changes of details, removal from the register and rights of review to the Victorian Civil and Administrative Tribunal concerning decisions made by the Registrar.

Other notable provisions 
The Act contains two general provisions in Part 6.  The first provision confirms that THR operators are not required to fence railways or contribute to fencing costs and that operators are not liable for any damage which may be caused by the railway not being fenced.  The remaining and final provision in the Act confers power on the Governor in Council to make regulations to support the Act including in relation to the asset register, criteria for registration on the group register, fees for registration, safety in connection with TH railways, powers of THR operators, conduct requirements, trespassing and interference with equipment, fixtures and other things.

Development 

The development of the proposal for the Tourist and Heritage Railways Act was managed by the Department of Transport in Victoria as part of its  Transport Legislation Review project.

The Department commenced the process by holding an inter Government agency workshop in June 2008 followed by workshops with the THR sector in August of that year.  This was followed by a period of research and policy development leading into further workshops and target consultation with the industry in April 2010 where new regulatory concepts were outlined in detail.  Ultimately, the proposal for a new regulatory scheme for the tourist and heritage railways sector was presented to the Victorian Parliament as proposed legislation in late July 2010.

Parliamentary approval

Introduction 
The Tourist and Heritage Railways Act was introduced into the upper house of the Victorian Parliament, the Legislative Council, as the Tourist and Heritage Railways Bill 2010.  The responsible Minister for the proposal was the Minister for Public Transport, the Hon Martin Pakula MLC.  The Hon Justin Madden MLC, the Minister for Planning, moved the second reading of the Bill on 27 July 2010 on behalf of the Public Transport Minister.

Second reading speech 

The Minister set the context for the Bill in his second reading speech in support of the Bill as follows:

"The Bill is aligned to the Transport Integration Act's new vision and shared objectives for transport in Victoria. This vision is one of an integrated and sustainable transport system. A sustainable transport system works to secure ongoing economic, social and environmental benefits for the state. It must promote social outcomes and economic prosperity. The transport system should also support the health and wellbeing of individuals and communities.

The tourist and heritage railway sector makes vital and significant contributions in these areas. Victoria's tourist and heritage railways positively contribute to community spirit and conserve Victoria's heritage for future generations.  The groups provide a foundation for local and regional community involvement and make major contributions, both directly and indirectly, to community wellbeing. The railways also attract local, regional and international tourism, benefiting local business and employment.

The Bill renews and modernises legislation applying to the tourist and heritage rail sector to ensure the sector is equipped to make these social and economic contributions both now and in the future. The groups that comprise the sector are diverse, but all groups within the scope of this Bill share common characteristics. They are active rail operators with strong heritage objectives, and they attract patronage from tourists and visitors. Indeed, tourist and heritage railways attract more than half a million visitors each year, bringing clear economic value to the State. Their operations run under not-for-profit organisational structures and revenue from visitors is of primary importance. Typically, the groups draw heavily on volunteers. They also rely on donations, Government grants and external funding for capital projects as well as for day-to-day activities.

Tourist and heritage rail operators keenly restore, preserve and operate heritage and other unique types of trains and trams. Approximately 3500 people are actively engaged in operational rail and tram preservation activities in Victoria—as employees, as members and as volunteers. The sector's story, collectively, is one of success. Victorians can be justly proud of their tourist and heritage railways and the social, economic and cultural benefits they bring to the State.

"This Bill supports these important not-for-profit groups to promote their ongoing viability. Entities that operate historical or heritage-related rail and tram services primarily as a tourist activity are given new settings under the Bill. This includes better arrangements relating to land and asset use, and access to a voluntary registration scheme that will promote improved performance and business practices.".

Debate and passage 
The Tourist and Heritage Railways Bill was strongly supported by the Opposition parties and other members during its passage through the Victorian Parliament.

Upper house 
The lead Liberal Party speaker in the first house of passage the Legislative Council, David Koch MLC, observed that—

This is a common-sense Bill that corrects and ties up many loose ends for these small rail operations, which will now have their own advisory group and great support from the Department of Transport in undertaking what I think is seen collectively as an important part of the tourism industry and of preserving our history.

The Bill was passed by the Legislative Council on 12 August 2010 after a short debate and introduced into the lower house, the Legislative Assembly, on the same day.

Lower house 

Support from the Opposition parties for the Bill was equally strong in the Legislative Assembly.  The lead speaker in the Legislative Assembly, the then Shadow Transport Minister and now the Minister for Public Transport in the Victorian Government, Terry Mulder MP, commented that—

"The Bill comes about as a result of the tourist and heritage railway operators, the manner in which their organisations were functioning and the fact that they were looking for a significant level of support in terms of viability and ongoing operation for their visitors. They provide a great tourist attraction here in Victoria in promoting the heritage of our railway networks, and it is commendable that the Government has picked up this issue and decided to throw its support behind these organisations, many of which are run by volunteers and people who are absolutely passionate about trains and particularly passionate about some of the older trains that were on the tracks hauling passengers on our railway network in the very early years.

The level of support for this Bill—and I have emails of support from a couple of the operators—indicates to me that the negotiations the operators have had with the government have been conducted in a pretty fine spirit . . .".

Passage, assent and commencement 
After several procedural delays, the Tourist and Heritage Railways Bill was ultimately passed by the Victorian Parliament on 7 October 2010. The Bill received royal assent on 19 October 2010 to become the Tourist and Heritage Railways Act 2010.

Regulations 
The Tourist and Heritage Railways Act was proclaimed to commence on 1 October 2011.  The Tourist and Heritage Railways Regulations 2011 were made to support the operation of the Act after being developed by the Department of Transport and commenced on the same day.  They were released for public comment and then approved by the Minister and presented to the Governor in Council for making and commencement.

Safety regulation

Legislation 

The safety compliance of most rail transport in Victoria is regulated under the Rail Safety Act 2006. The main railways regulated include the Melbourne heavy rail system, the Melbourne tram and light rail network, Victoria's regional standard and broad gauge rail networks and regional tourist and heritage railways.  Operators are subject to safety duties, a requirement to be accredited and a range of compliance sanctions.  Railways excluded from coverage under the Act include railways in mines, amusement and theme park railways and slipways.

Regulator 

The safety regulator for the application and enforcement of the Rail Safety Act 2006 and therefore the oversight of the safety performance of the tourist and heritage rail sector in Victoria is the Director, Transport Safety. The Director operates under the trading name, Transport Safety Victoria.  The office of the Director is established under the Transport Integration Act 2010 and is independent of the Department of Transport and responsible Ministers except in limited circumstances.

See also 

 Rail transport in Victoria
 Heritage railways
 Railways in Melbourne
 Trams in Melbourne
 Transport Legislation Review
 Transport Integration Act
 Director of Public Transport
 Public Transport Development Authority
 Director, Transport Safety
 Director, Public Transport Safety
 VicTrack
 Safety

References

External links 
 Department of Transport
 Transport Safety Victoria

 
Victoria (Australia) legislation
Rail transport preservation in Australia
Tourist and Heritage Railways Act
2010 in Australian law
2010s in Victoria (Australia)
History of rail transport in Australia
2010 in rail transport
Transport legislation